Baydar Nature Reserve is a regional nature reserve (zakaznik) located in the city of Sevastopol in Crimea, a region internationally recognised as Ukraine but occupied by Russia since 2014. The Baydar Nature Reserve is part of the Baydar Valley, and borders the nature reserves of Cape Aya and Yalta Mountain-Forest Nature Reserve.

Description 
Located in the Baydar Valley, the Baydar Nature Reserve is noted by the Encyclopedia of Modern Ukraine for its multi-tiered appearance, including elements of both the Baydar Valley and the Crimean Mountains, in particular its . Approximately 77% of the reserve is covered by forests, primarily juniper, oaks, ash, beech, hornbeam, and pistachio. A total of 54 plant species and 41 animal species live in the reserve, among them rare species.

An important part of the Baydar Nature Reserve is its role in water protection. The Chorna river runs through the reserve, as do several waterfalls. The , Crimea's largest reservoir, is also included in the reserve.

It was declared a landscape zakaznik of national importance on 31 May 1990 by the Cabinet of Ministers of the Ukrainian Soviet Socialist Republic.

References 

Geography of Crimea